Sarun Promkaew (born February 15, 1982), simply known as Run, is a retired professional footballer from Thailand. He played for Krung Thai Bank FC in the 2008 AFC Champions League group stages.

Honours

Club
Krung Thai Bank 
 Thai Premier League  Champions (2) : 2002-03, 2003-04
 Kor Royal Cup  Winners (2) : 2003, 2004

References

External links
 Profile at Goal
 

1982 births
Living people
Sarun Promkaew
Sarun Promkaew
Association football utility players
Sarun Promkaew
Sarun Promkaew
Sarun Promkaew
Sarun Promkaew
Association football fullbacks
Association football midfielders
Association football forwards